The 2nd constituency of Lot is a French legislative constituency in the Lot département.

Description

 From 2 April 1992 to  2 October 1992, Martin Malvy was State Secretary for Relations with Parliament and Government spokesman, and, from 2 October 1992 to 29 March 1993, He was Budget Ministers in the Bérégovoy Government. He was replaced by his substitute, Marie-Claude Malaval.

Deputies

Election results

2022

 
 
 
 
 
 
 
|-
| colspan="8" bgcolor="#E9E9E9"|
|-
 
 
 
 
 
 
 
 
 

* PS dissident

2017

2012

Jean Launay was reelected in the first round.

References

Sources
 

 

2